Alexander Strahan (1833–1918) was a 19th-century publisher. His company, Alexander Strahan & Co., based at Ludgate Hill in London, published what was arguably one of the dominant periodicals in the 1860s, a monthly magazine called Good Words.

Early life and career
Born in Edinburgh, he was a Scottish Presbyterian. He started his publishing business in Edinburgh in 1858. He moved to London in 1862 and "widened his interest to include what his modern day biographer Patricia Sebrebrnik identifies as the literature of Christian social reform." One of his financial backers was Sir Henry Seymour King, through whom Strahan made a lucrative deal with the poet Alfred, Lord Tennyson.

List of periodicals
 Good Words (established 1860)
 The Sunday Magazine (established 1864)
 Argosy (established 1865)
 The Contemporary Review (established 1866)
 Good Words for the Young (retitled Good Things for the Young)
 Saint Paul's Magazine
 The Day of Rest: An Illustrated Journal of Sunday Reading (established 1872)

References

Srebrnik, Patricia Thomas (1986) - Alexander Strahan, Victorian Publisher (University of Michigan Press)

1833 births
1918 deaths
19th-century publishers (people)
19th-century Scottish people
19th-century Scottish Presbyterians